Rómulo Alberto Roux Moses (born 8 January 1965) is a Panamanian politician, chairman of the party Democratic Change since January 2018. He was the party's candidate for the 2019 general election.

He has served as the Minister of External Affairs.

References 

1965 births
Living people
People from Panama City
Panamanian politicians